The 2016 British Academy Television Awards were held on 8 May 2016.

The nominations were announced on 30 March, with Wolf Hall nominated for four awards.

Winners and nominees

Programmes with multiple nominations

Most major wins

In Memoriam

Victoria Wood
Terry Wogan
Val Doonican
Peter Dimmock
Tony Warren
Hugh Scully
Deborah Shipley
Stephen Lewis
Anthony Valentine
Warren Mitchell
Frank Kelly
Sue Lloyd-Roberts
Patrick Macnee
Jon Beazley
Hazel Adair
George Cole
Denise Robertson
Jimmy Hill
Garry Shandling
Paul Daniels
Jack Gold
Jim Pullin
Cilla Black
David Nobbs
Cliff Michelmore
Ray Fitzwalter
Ronnie Corbett

Notes
Strictly Come Dancing won its first BAFTA this year.

References

British Academy Television Awards
2016 in British television
British Academy Television Awards
May 2016 events in the United Kingdom
2016 television awards
Royal Festival Hall